Karachay-Cherkessia Autonomous Oblast was an autonomous oblast of the Soviet Union that was created on 12 January 1922, and was the predecessor of the Karachay-Cherkess Republic. The Karachay-Cherkess oblast was first formed in 1922 for the Circassian (Cherkess) and Karachays peoples. The oblast was dissolved in 1926, to form the Karachay Autonomous Oblast and Cherkess Autonomous Oblast. Karachay Autonomous Oblast was dissolved in 1943, when the Karachays were exiled to Central Asia for their alleged collaboration with the Germans. In 1957, upon their return, the Karachay-Cherkess autonomous oblast was recreated. During this time, part of the territory was incorporated into the Georgian SSR. In 1991 it became a republic.

References

Autonomous oblasts of the Soviet Union
History of Karachay-Cherkessia
States and territories established in 1922
1922 establishments in Russia
1991 disestablishments in the Soviet Union